This is a list of books and essays about Pedro Almodóvar:

References

Almodovar